Moose Cree (Cree: Mōsonī or Ililiw), also known as Moosonee, and together with Eastern Swampy Cree, also known as Central Cree, West James Bay Cree or West Main Cree. They speak the l-dialect of the Cree language.

The Moose Cree were first noted in Jesuit Relations for 1671, along the shores of James Bay and along the Moose River. On the Ochagach map (c. 1728), they (as "Monsonnis") were noted as far inland as the Rainy Lake region.

First Nations
 Abitibi River Cree (historical)
 Abitibiwinni First Nation (also Algonquin and Ojibwe)
 Wahgoshig First Nation (also Algonquin and Ojibwe)
 Moose River Cree (historical)
Brunswick House First Nation (also Ojibwe)
Chapleau Cree First Nation
Constance Lake First Nation (also Ojibwe)
Kashechewan First Nation (also Swampy Cree)
Matachewan First Nation (also Ojibwe)
Missanabie Cree First Nation (also Ojibwe)
Moose Cree First Nation
Taykwa Tagamou Nation
 Lake Nipigon Cree (historical)
 Piscotagami River Cree (historical)
 Rainy Lake Cree (historical)

External links
 Bishop, Charles A. "Territorial Groups Before 1821: Cree and Ojibwa" in Handbook of North American Indians: Subarctic. 
 Bishop, Charles A. "The Western James Bay Cree: Aboriginal and Early Historic Adaptions" in Prairie Forum, 1982, Vol. 8, No.2.
 Honigmann, John J. "West Main Cree" in Handbook of North American Indians: Subarctic. 
 "Monsoni" in Handbook of American Indians North of Mexico: Part 1: A-M.

Cree